Abhay Vidhya Mandir Senior Secondary School, also known as A.V.M., in Hindaun (District Karauli) is a boarding school in Rajasthan, India. Earlier it was known as Vidhya Mandir. It was started by Abhyanand on 7 July 1971. The school is affiliated with the Board of Secondary Education Rajasthan (BSER). 
The admission process for the school starts in the month of May and school starts in July.

Facilities
The school has playgrounds for cricket, basketball, volleyball, table tennis, badminton and other sports.

Principals

See also
 Hindaun Block

References

External links
 Entry at Findthebest.in

High schools and secondary schools in Rajasthan
Hindaun
Educational institutions established in 1971
1971 establishments in Rajasthan